This is a list of Buddhist temples, monasteries, stupas, and pagodas in the People's Republic of China for which there are Wikipedia articles, sorted by location.

Anhui
Guangji Temple (Wuhu)
Langya Temple
Mingjiao Temple (Anhui)
Sanzu Temple
Shangchan Temple
Yingjiang Temple
Zhenfeng Pagoda

Mount Jiuhua
Baisui Palace
Ganlu Temple (Mount Jiuhua)
Huacheng Temple
Shrine of Living Buddha
Tiantai Temple (Mount Jiuhua)
Zhantalin
Zhiyuan Temple (Mount Jiuhua)

Beijing

Badachu
Bailin Temple (Beijing)
Big Bell Temple (or Juesheng Temple)
Cheng'en Temple
Cloud Platform at Juyongguan
Dahui Temple
Dajue Temple
Dule Temple
Fahai Temple
Fayuan Temple
Guanghua Temple (Beijing)
Guangji Temple (Beijing)
Hongluo Temple
Jietai Temple
Lingguang Temple (Beijing)
Miaoying Temple
Pagoda of Tianning Temple
Tanzhe Temple
Temple of Azure Clouds
Tianning Temple (Beijing)
Tongjiao Temple
Wanshou Temple
Wofo Temple
Xifeng Temple
Xihuang Temple
Yonghe Temple
Yunju Temple
Zhenjue Temple
Zhihua Temple

Chongqing 
Ciyun Temple (Chongqing)
Luohan Temple (Chongqing)
Shuanggui Temple

Fujian

Chengtian Temple (Quanzhou)
Chongsheng Temple (Fujian)
Cishou Temple
Dizang Temple (Fuzhou)
Guanghua Temple (Putian)
Guangxiao Temple (Putian)
Hualin Temple (Fuzhou)
Huayan Temple (Ningde)
Jinshan Temple (Fujian)
Kaiyuan Temple (Quanzhou)
Linyang Temple
Longshan Temple (Jinjiang)
Nanshan Temple
Pagoda of Cishou Temple
South Putuo Temple
Wanfu Temple
Xichan Temple (Fujian)
Yongquan Temple (Fuzhou)

Gansu 

Dafo Temple (Zhangye)
Ta'er Temple (Suoyang City)
White Horse Pagoda, Dunhuang

Guangdong
Guangxiao Temple (Guangzhou)
Hoi Tong Monastery
Kaiyuan Temple (Chaozhou)
Lingshan Temple (Shantou)
Nanhua Temple
Qingyun Temple (Guangdong)
Temple of the Six Banyan Trees
Yunmen Temple (Guangdong)

Guizhou 

Hongfu Temple (Guiyang)
Qianming Temple

Hainan 
Nanshan Temple (Sanya)

Hebei

Geyuan Temple
Kaishan Temple
Liaodi Pagoda
Lingxiao Pagoda
Linji Temple
Longxing Monastery
Pagoda of Bailin Temple
Puning Temple (Hebei)
Putuo Zongcheng Temple
Xumi Pagoda

Henan

Daxingguo Temple
Fawang Temple
Iron Pagoda
Jidu Temple
Jinshan Temple (Hebi)
Pagoda Forest at Shaolin Temple
Qizu Pagoda
Shaolin Monastery 
Songyue Pagoda
White Horse Temple
Xiangyan Temple
Youguo Temple

Hubei
Guiyuan Temple
Baotong Temple
Wuying Pagoda
Wuzu Temple

Hunan 

Baiyun Temple (Ningxiang)
Fuyan Temple
Grand Temple of Mount Heng
Guangji Temple (Hunan)
Kaifu Temple
Lingsheng Temple
Lushan Temple
Miyin Temple
Nantai Temple
Puguang Temple (Zhangjiajie)
Puji Temple (Ningxiang)
Shangfeng Temple
Yunmen Temple (Hunan) 
Zhaoshan Temple
Zhusheng Temple (Hunan)

Hong Kong

Cham Shan Monastery
Chi Lin Nunnery
Miu Fat Buddhist Monastery
Po Lin Monastery
Ten Thousand Buddhas Monastery
Tsing Shan Monastery
Tsz Shan Monastery
Tung Lin Kok Yuen
Tung Po Tor Monastery

Inner Mongolia
 Five Pagoda Temple (Hohhot)

Jiangsu

Chongshan Temple (Jiangsu)
Daming Temple
Dinghui Temple
Gaomin Temple
Guangjiao Temple (Nantong)
Hanshan Temple
Huiji Temple (Nanjing)
Huqiu Tower
Jiming Temple
Jinshan Temple (Zhenjiang)
Linggu Temple
Lingyanshan Temple
Longchang Temple
Qixia Temple
Tianning Temple (Changzhou) (天宁宝塔) in Changzhou, which contains the tallest pagoda in the world. Height: .
Tiger Hill Pagoda
Xingfu Temple (Changshu)
Xiyuan Temple
Yunyan Temple (Suzhou)

Jiangxi

Donglin Temple
Jingju Temple (Ji'an)
Nengren Temple (Jiujiang)
Puning Temple (Jiangxi)
Zhenru Temple (Jiangxi)

Jilin 
Banruo Temple (Changchun)
Dizang Temple (Changchun)
Guanyin Ancient Temple

Liaoning 
Banruo Temple (Shenyang)
Ci'en Temple (Liaoning)
Fengguo Temple
Zhiyuan Temple (Panjin)

Macau 
 Kun Iam Temple, (also known as Pou Chai Temple, Chinese: 普濟禪院)

Ningxia
Baisigou Square Pagoda
Haibao Pagoda Temple
Hongfo Pagoda
One Hundred and Eight Stupas
Pagoda of Chengtian Temple

Shaanxi

Caotang Temple
Daci'en Temple
Daxingshan Temple
Famen Temple
Giant Wild Goose Pagoda
Guangren Temple
Jianfu Temple
Jingye Temple
Qinglong Temple (Xi'an)
Small Wild Goose Pagoda
Wolong Temple
Xiangji Temple (Shaanxi)
Xingjiao Temple

Shandong 
Four-gates pagoda
Lingyan Temple (Jinan)
Pizhi Pagoda
Xingguo Temple (Jinan)
Zhanshan Temple (Shandong)

Shanghai

Baoshan Temple
Chenxiang Pavilion
Donglin Temple (Shanghai)
Hongfu Temple (Shanghai)
Jade Buddha Temple
Jing'an Temple
Longhua Temple
Yuanming Jiangtang
Zhenru Temple (Shanghai)

Shanxi

Chongshan Temple (Shanxi)
Huayan Temple (Datong)
Pagoda of Fogong Temple
Puhua Temple
Qifo Temple
Shuanglin Temple
The Hanging Temple
Xuanzhong Temple
Yanqing Temple
Yuanzhao Temple
Zhenguo Temple

Mount Wutai
Bishan Temple
Dailuoding
Foguang Temple
Great White Pagoda
Guangzong Temple (Mount Wutai)
Gufo Temple
Jile Temple
Jinge Temple
Longhua Temple
Mimi Temple
Nanchan Temple
Puhua Temple
Pusading
Qixian Temple (Mount Wutai)
Shifang Temple
Shuxiang Temple
Tayuan Temple
Wenshu Temple (Mount Wutai)
Xiantong Temple
Yanshan Temple
Youguo Temple
Zunsheng Temple

Sichuan

Bao'en Temple (Pingwu)
Baoguang Temple
Luohan Temple (Shifang)
Qiongzhu Temple
Wenshu Temple (Chengdu)
Wuyou Temple
Zhaojue Temple

Mount Emei
Baoguo Temple (Mount Emei)
Hongchunping Temple
Huazang Temple
Wannian Temple
Xixiang Chi

Tianjin 
Guangji Temple (Tianjin)
Temple of Great Compassion

Tibet Autonomous Region (Xizang)

Yunnan

Chongshan Temple (Yunnan)
Foguang Temple (Mangshi)
Guangyun Temple
Huating Temple
Jinlong Temple
Mange Temple
Puti Temple
Qiongzhu Temple
Three Pagodas
Tongwadian (Dali)
Yuantong Temple
Zhusheng Temple (Yunnan)

Zhejiang

Baoguo Temple (Former temple)
Dafo Temple
Guoqing Temple
Jingci Temple
Jiangxin Temple
Jingju Temple
Lingyin Temple
Liuhe Pagoda
Mingjiao Temple 
Qita Temple
Temple of King Ashoka
Tiantong Temple
Yanfu Temple (Wuyi County)

Mount Putuo
Huiji Temple (Mount Putuo)
Fayu Temple
Puji Temple

See also
 Buddhism in the People's Republic of China
 Chinese architecture
 Kyaung
 List of Buddhist architecture in China
 List of Buddhist temples
 National Key Buddhist Temples in Han Chinese Area

Notes

External links

 BuddhaNet's Comprehensive Directory of Buddhist Temples sorted by country
 Buddhactivity Dharma Centres database

 
 
People's Republic of China